A national identity of the English as the people or ethnic group dominant in England dates to the Anglo-Saxon period. The establishing of a single English ethnic identity dates to at least AD 731, as exemplified in Bede's Ecclesiastical History of the English People and the construction of Offa's Dyke, becoming a national identity with the unification of the Kingdom of England in the ninth and tenth centuries, and changing status once again in the eleventh century after the Norman Conquest, when Englishry came to be the status of the subject indigenous population.

From the eighteenth century, the terms 'English' and 'British' began to be seen as interchangeable to many of the English.

While the official United Kingdom census does record ethnicity, English/Welsh/Scottish/Northern Irish/British is a single tick-box under the "White" heading for the answer to the ethnicity question asked in England and Wales (while making the distinction of white Irish).

Although Englishness and Britishness are used synonymously in some contexts, the two terms are not identical, and the relation of each to the other is complex. Englishness is often a response to different national identities within Britain, such as Scottishness, Irishness, Welshness and Cornishness.

Sometimes Englishness is thought to be encapsulated in terms of a particular relation to sport: fair play, for instance. Arguably, England's "national games" are football and, particularly, cricket.  As cricket historian Dominic Malcolm argues, the link between cricket and England's national identity became solidified through literature. Works such as James Love's "Cricket: an heroic poem" and Mary Mitford's "our Village,"  along with Nyren's "cricketers of my Time" and Pycroft's "The Cricket Field," purported to identify the characteristics of cricket with the notional characteristics of English society, such as pragmatism, integrity, and independence.

See also
 Cricket test
 Culture of England
 Social history of England
 St George's Day in England
 National identity
 Scottish national identity

References

Further reading

External links
 
 
 
 
 
 
 

English culture
English society
History of nationality
National identities
Politics of England
Identity